The 2023 U Sports Men's Final 8 Basketball Tournament was held March 10–12, 2023, in Halifax, Nova Scotia, to determine a national champion for the 2022–23 U Sports men's basketball season.

The defending champion Carleton Ravens entered the tournament ranked third, following a loss in the Ontario provincial semi-final game to the Ottawa Gee-Gees. However, the Ravens overcame three teams in this tournament, including Ottawa in the semi-finals, and the St. Francis Xavier X-Men in the first ever double-overtime final, to claim their 17th national title. The game set a record for the highest number of points scored by a single team in the championship game (men or women)—109—and the highest number of combined points in the title game (men or women)—213. It was Carleton's fourth straight crown, 11th of the last 12, and 17th of the last 20. They remain the winningest top division school in Canada or the United States.

Host
The tournament was hosted by St. Francis Xavier University, the second time the school hosted the championship, after previously doing so in 1968. St. Francis Xavier was originally awarded the hosting rights for the 2021 championship, but that tournament was cancelled due to the COVID-19 pandemic in Canada.

The tournament was held at the Scotiabank Centre for the fourth time in seven years, and was the 33rd time the tournament was played in Halifax.

Participating teams

Championship bracket

Consolation bracket

References

External links
 Tournament Web Site

2022–23 in Canadian basketball
U Sports Men's Basketball Championship
St. Francis Xavier University
March 2023 sports events in Canada
2023 in Nova Scotia
Sports competitions in Halifax, Nova Scotia